Copi may refer to:
 Copi, real name Raúl Damonte Botana, an Argentine writer
 COPI, a protein
 Copi, an alternate name for certain species of Asian carp: See 
 Copi Nature Reserve, a nature reserve and indigenous village in Suriname

People
 Irving Copi (1917–2002), an American philosopher
 Tomaž Čopi (1970), a Slovenian sailor
 Živa Čopi (1988), a Slovenian handball player